Camille Charles Le Clerc de Fresne, known as Chevalier de Fresne (1741–1797) was Governor General of Mauritius (1785) and Puducherry from 1789 to 1792 in the French Colonial Empire.

He married a widow, Emilie-Thomase de Solminihac (1770–1846), in Puducherry, on 20 June 1788. One significant event occurred in his tenure was Mr. Pierre Sonnerat, Chief of Yanam, was involved in the business along with other traders. Pierre Sonnerat's commercial involvement brought serious consequences to his administrative post (Chief of Yanam). The petitions were made against Pierre Sonnerat in this connection, to Chevalier de Fresne, the then French Governor General in Puducherry. On 5 June 1790 a French man "De Mars" complained against Pierre Sonnerat for the first time.

References

French colonial governors and administrators
History of Puducherry
Governors of French India
18th-century French people
Date of death unknown
Year of birth unknown
Year of death unknown
Governors of Isle de France (Mauritius)